Edgardo Togni was an Argentine film producer and director who worked in his country in the from the 1940s to the 1960s and founded the Directores Argentinos Cinematográficos.

Filmography

Production Assistant 

 La verdadera victoria (1944)
 Mosquita muerta (1946)
 Navidad de los pobres (1947)
 El tango vuelve a París (1948)
 Un tropezón cualquiera da en la vida (1949)
 Mujeres que bailan (1949)
 Juan Globo (1949)
 Toscanito y los detectives (1950)

Production Manager 

 Vivir un instante (1951)

Assistant Director 

 Palermo (1937)
 Con el dedo en el gatillo (1940)
 La mentirosa (1942)

Production Manager 

 Celos (1946)
 Una mujer sin cabeza (1947)
 La vendedora de fantasías (1950)

Director's Assistant 

 Confesión (1940)
 Historia de una noche (1941)
 Los ojos más lindos del mundo (1943)
 Pasaporte a Río (1948)

Screenwriter 

 Argentina tierra pródiga (1963)

Director 

 Su seguro servidor (1954)
 Los maridos de mamá (1956)
 Hay que bañar al nene (1958)
 Comahue (1963)
 Argentina tierra pródiga (1963)

References 

Argentine film producers
Year of birth unknown